Susan Rogers Cooper (born 1947) is an American mystery novelist from Austin, Texas. Her works place her in the mystery cosy category.

Selected works
The Milt Kovak Mysteries
The Man In The Green Chevy (1988 St. Martins Press HC; 1991 Worldwide PB)
Houston In The Rearview Mirror (1990 St. Martins Press HC; 1992 Worldwide PB)
Other People's Houses (1990 St. Martins Press HC; 1993 Worldwide PB)
Chasing Away The Devil (1991 St. Martins Press HC; 1993 Worldwide PB)
Dead Moon On The Rise (1994 St. Martins Press HC)
Doctors and Lawyers and Such (1995 St. Martins Press HC)
Lying Wonders (2003 St. Martins Press HC; 2004 Worldwide PB)
Vegas Nerve (2007 St. Martins Press HC)
Shotgun Wedding (2008 Severn House HC; TPB)
Rude Awakening (2009 Severn House HC; TPB)
Husbands & Wives (2011 Severn House HC)
Dark Waters (2013 Severn House HC)
Countdown (2014 Severn House HC)
Best Served Cold  (2016 Severn House HC)

The E.J. Pugh Mysteries
One, Two, What Did Daddy Do? (1992 St. Martins Press HC; 1996 Avon PB)
Hickory Dickory Stalk (1996 Avon PB)
Home Again, Home Again (1997 Avon PB)
There Was A Little Girl (1998 Avon PB)
A Crooked Little House (1999 Avon PB; 1999 Book Of The Month Club HC)
Not In My Backyard (1999 Avon PB)
Don't Drink The Water (2000 Avon PB)
Romanced To Death (2008 Severn House HC; TPB)
Full Circle (2010 Severn House HC; TPB)
Dead Weight (2012 Severn House HC)
Gone In A Flash (2013 Severn House HC)
Dead To The World (2014 Severn House HC)
Student Body (2017 Severn House HC)

The Kimmey Kruse Mysteries
Funny As A Dead Comic (1993 St. Martins Press HC)
Funny As A Dead relative (1994 St. Martins Press HC)

Kimmey also appears in two short stories
"Barbecued Bimbo" from Malice Domestic 5 (1996 Pocket Books PB)
"Ghost Busted" from Murder They Wrote II (1998 Berkeley PB)

A stand-alone short story titled "Family Tradition" appears in Vengeance is Hers (1997 Signet PB)

References

External links
 http://www.fantasticfiction.co.uk/c/susan-rogers-cooper

1947 births
Living people
20th-century American novelists
21st-century American novelists
American mystery writers
American women novelists
Writers from Austin, Texas
Women mystery writers
20th-century American women writers
21st-century American women writers
Novelists from Texas